Fambly 42 is the fourth studio album by San Pedro-based punk band Toys That Kill, released on May 15, 2012 on Recess Records. It was the first album recorded in their own Clown Sound studios.

Track listing
"Mobbed By the 3's"  1:44
"V-Chip"  1:10
"Waltz One Million"  2:16
"The Nervous Rocks"  1:38
"Abort Me Mother Earth"  2:18
"Stye"  2:15
"I'm Foaming!"  2:34
"I've Been Stabbed!"  1:05
"Ape Me"  1:22
"Who Scored?"  2:36
"Fambly"  1:46
"I Don't Wanna Be Around"  2:07
"Freddy and His Mother"  3:22
"Cold Boys"  2:08
"Clap For Alaska"  3:26
| total_length = 31:47

Personnel
Todd Congelliere – Vocals, Guitar
Sean Cole – Vocals, Guitar
Jimmy Felix – Drums
Chachi Ferrera – Bass, Vocals

Reception
PopMatters praised the album and described it as "fifteen tracks of fist-pumping sing-along punk rock you’ll definitely want to heft a beverage to." Punk News gave the album three and a half stars and but conceded that "overall Fambly essentially consists of one good song rewritten many times over." Razorcake called the album "the aural equivalent of a culinary masterpiece."

References

2012 albums